Goward Peak is a sharp-pointed peak rising to about  just east of Fournier Ridge, Desko Mountains, on Rothschild Island, Antarctica. It was named by the Advisory Committee on Antarctic Names for Commander Richard F. Goward, Executive Officer on USCGC Glacier (WAGB-4) during Operation Deep Freeze, 1969.

References

Mountains of Palmer Land